A rare species is a group of organisms that are very uncommon, scarce, or infrequently encountered. This designation may be applied to either a plant or animal taxon, and is distinct from the term endangered or threatened. Designation of a rare species may be made by an official body, such as a national government, state, or province. The term more commonly appears without reference to specific criteria. The International Union for Conservation of Nature does not normally make such designations, but may use the term in scientific discussion.

Rarity rests on a specific species being represented by a small number of organisms worldwide, usually fewer than 10,000. However, a species having a very narrow endemic range or fragmented habitat also influences the concept. Almost 75% of known species can be classified as "rare".

Rare species are species with small populations. Many will move into the endangered or vulnerable category if the negative factors affecting them continue to operate. Well-known examples of rare species - because these are large terrestrial animals - include the Himalayan brown bear, Fennec fox, Wild Asiatic buffalo, or the Hornbill.

They are not endangered yet, but classified as "at risk", although the frontier between these categories is increasingly difficult to draw given the general paucity of data on rare species. This is especially the case in the world Ocean where many 'rare' species not seen for decades may well have gone extinct unnoticed, if they are not already on the verge of extinction like the mexican Vaquita.  

A species may be endangered or vulnerable, but not considered rare if it has a large, dispersed population. IUCN uses the term "rare" as a designation for species found in isolated geographical locations. Rare species are generally considered threatened because a small population size is obviously less likely to recover from ecological disasters.

A rare plant's legal status can be observed through the USDA's Plants Database.

Rare species 

Notes:

  Last recorded that 7 were in captivity in 1960, in zoos, circuses etc., in the International Zoo Yearbook II. Reports that there is a small population left in Malay Peninsula and Myanmar.
  On 19 March 2018, the last known Northern white rhinoceros male died, but his and another male's sperm was collected and has been used to fertilize eggs as part of a de-extinction effort. Last two known Northern white rhinoceros are both female and held in captivity in the Ol Pejeta Conservancy, Kenya. Unknown if anymore exist in the wildlife and if none exist in the wildlife they would be functionally extinct.

See also
Abundance (ecology)
Biodiversity Action Plan
Chelonoidis nigra abingdonii
Common species
Critical depensation
Endangered Species Recovery Plan
 Rare Species Conservation Centre

References

External links 
 USDA Plant Database

Further reading
 Gorbunov, Y. N., Dzybov, D. S., Kuzmin, Z. E. and Smirnov, I. A. 2008. Methodological recommendations for botanic gardens on the reintroduction of rare and threatened plants. Botanic Gardens Conservation International (BGCI).

Conservation biology
Environmental terminology
Habitat
Biota by conservation status